The secretary of agrarian reform (Filipino: Kalihim ng Repormang Pansakahan) is the head of the Department of Agrarian Reform and is a member of the president’s Cabinet.

List

References

External links
DAR website

 
Agrarian Reform
Philippines